Stephen Charles Gunzenhauser (born April 8, 1942) is an American conductor of classical music. He was the music director of the Lancaster Symphony Orchestra for 40 years, retiring after the 2019–20 season. In 2005, he founded the Endless Mountain Music Festival, an annual summer music festival held in towns in Pennsylvania and New York. Gunzenhauser has recorded for Naxos and other labels. He is the 5th most recorded American conductor.

Early life and education
Stephen Charles Gunzenhauser was born in New York, on April 8, 1942. He attended the High School of Music & Art. He then studied at the Oberlin College Conservatory of Music, graduating with a Bachelor of Music degree in 1963, and at the Salzburg Mozarteum. He trained further at New England Conservatory of Music in Boston, taking a master's degree in 1965. He held three Fulbright grants and completed his education at the Cologne Hochschule für Musik, where he was awarded an artist diploma in 1968.

Career

In 1967, Gunzenhauser took first prize in the Santiago conducting competition, and from 1967 to 1969 he guest-conducted the Rhenish Chamber Orchestra, Cologne. He  was assistant conductor to Igor Markevitch and l'Orchestre National de l'Opera de Monte Carlo (1968−69), and to Leopold Stokowski and the American Symphony Orchestra in New York (1969−70).

Gunzenhauser was music director of the Brooklyn Center Chamber Orchestra (1970−1972), and was artistic director (1974−1982), then administrative director (1982−1987) of the Wilmington Music School. In 1978, he became music director of the Delaware Symphony Orchestra, and became principal conductor (1978−1981). He later served 40 years as the music director of the Lancaster Symphony Orchestra, Pennsylvania. He retired from it after the 2019−20 season.

In 2005, Gunzenhauser started the Endless Mountain Music Festival. The festival has a 62-piece orchestra made up of an internationally diverse group of musicians. It is held every summer in cities and towns on the Pennsylvania and New York borders, including Canton, Blossburg, Mansfield, Troy, and Wellsboro, Pennsylvania; and Corning and Elmira, New York. Gunzenhauser first had the idea for the festival when he was visiting the region on a trip with his wife, and was impressed with the area’s natural beauty and the gaslit main street of Wellsboro.

Awards and honors
In 1990, the state of Delaware appointed Gunzenhauser as the state's First Cultural Ambassador.

In 1999, the state of Delaware awarded Gunzenhauser the Order of the First State.

Personal life
Gunzenhauser is married to his wife Shelly. They have two daughters.

Recordings
Gunzenhauser has recorded for Naxos and other labels. He is the 5th most recorded American conductor as of 2019. His 1991 cycle of the nine symphonies of Dvořák was praised. In Gramophone, Ivan March wrote of the conductor:

Recordings conducted by Gunzenhauser include:

Source:

References

Sources

External links
Stephen Gunzenhauser on Discogs

1942 births
Living people
20th-century American conductors (music)
21st-century American conductors (music)
American male conductors (music)
Classical musicians from Delaware